This is a timeline of women's suffrage in Illinois. Women's suffrage in Illinois began in the mid 1850s. The first women's suffrage group was created in 1855 in Earlville, Illinois by Susan Hoxie Richardson. The Illinois Woman Suffrage Association (IWSA), later renamed the Illinois Equal Suffrage Association (IESA), was created by Mary Livermore in 1869. This group held annual conventions and petitioned various governmental bodies in Illinois for women's suffrage. On June 19, 1891, women gained the right to vote for school offices. However, it wasn't until 1913 that women saw expanded suffrage. That year women in Illinois were granted the right to vote for Presidential electors and various local offices. Suffragists continued to fight for full suffrage in the state. Finally, Illinois became the first state to ratify the Nineteenth Amendment on June 10, 1919. The League of Women Voters (LWV) was announced in Chicago on February 14, 1920.

19th century

1850s 
1855

 Alonzo Jackson Grover gives the first women's suffrage speech in Illinois.
Susan Hoxie Richardson creates the Earlville Suffrage Association.

1860s 
1869

 Mary Livermore organizes a women's suffrage convention in Chicago.
During the convention, the Illinois Woman Suffrage Association (IWSA) is created.
Livermore starts the women's suffrage newspaper, The Agitator.

1870s 

1870

 February: Frances Willard and the IWSA petition the Illinois Constitutional Convention to include women's suffrage in the state constitution.
February: Annual meeting of IWSA held at the Opera House in Springfield, Illinois.
1871

 Annual convention of IWSA held at Farewell Hall in Chicago.
1872

 Annual convention of IWSA held in the Opera House in Bloomington, Illinois.

1873

 School offices are opened to women in Illinois.
1874

 Ten women are elected to County Superintendent of Schools.

1876

 Elizabeth Boynton Harbert becomes president of IWSA.
 IWSA affiliates with the National Women's Suffrage Association (NWSA).
1879

 Frances Willard brings a petition to the General Assembly for women to have suffrage rights over alcohol-related issues in Illinois.

1880s 
1884

 The American Woman Suffrage Association (AWSA) holds their annual convention in Chicago.

1885

 Susan B. Anthony addresses the Cook County Woman's Suffrage Society.

1887

 Mary Holmes becomes president of IWSA.

1888

 The Decatur Women's Suffrage Club is formed by Sophie Gibb and 100 other women in Decatur, Illinois.
The Naperville Equal Suffrage Club is created.

1890s 
1890

 IWSA changes their name to the Illinois Equal Suffrage Association (IESA).

1891

 April 6: Fifteen women led by Ellen Martin legally vote in Lombard, Illinois using a loophole in their city charter.
June 19: Women gain the right to vote in school elections with a School Suffrage law.
1892

 The Illinois Supreme Court decides that the School Suffrage law is constitutional.

1893

 A bill for Township suffrage for women is introduced in the state Senate, but is not successful in the House.
 A bill to repeal the School Suffrage Law is defeated in the state House.
March: Carrie Chapman Catt tours the southern part of Illinois.
1894

 The Chicago Political Equality League (CPEL) is created.

1895

 A bill for Township suffrage is again introduced in the Senate, but fails.
April: IWSA holds their annual convention in Decatur.

1897

 Caroline Fairfield Corbin creates the Illinois Association Opposed to the Extension of Suffrage to Women.
Bills for Township and Bond suffrage are introduced in the state legislature, but do not pass.
1898

 Women's suffrage groups lobbied for women to be exempt from taxation since they did not vote, but the legislature did not act on the idea.

1899

 Again, bills for Township and Bond suffrage are introduced in the legislature, but do not pass.

20th century

1900s 

1900

 October: The Illinois Equal Suffrage Association (IESA) holds their annual convention in Edgewater, Chicago.
Elizabeth Boynton Harbert becomes president IESA.
1901
 Elizabeth F. Long becomes IESA president.
1902

 IESA holds their annual convention in Jacksonville, Illinois and Kate Hughes is elected president.
1903

 Hughes is elected president of IESA for a second term.

1904

 Catharine Waugh McCulloch is elected president of IESA.

1905

 IESA holds their annual convention in Chicago and Ella S. Stewart is elected the president.

1906

 Stewart is re-elected as IESA president.
1907

 The IESA convention is held at the Illinois State Fair in Springfield.
1908

 June: IESA works with NAWSA to lobby delegates to the Republican National Convention in Chicago.

1909

 A municipal suffrage bill goes to the Chicago City Council, but does not pass.
November 19: Emmeline Pankhurst and Ethel Snowden speak in Chicago at the IESA annual convention.
The Chicago Men's Equal Suffrage League is formed.

1910s 

1910

 Grace Wilbur Trout becomes president of the Chicago Political Equality League (CPEL).
July: Suffragists begin automobile tours around Illinois, speaking on women's suffrage.
October: IESA holds their state convention in Elgin, Illinois.
Mrs. Willis S. McCrea creates the North Side Branch of IESA.
1911

 CPEL moves their headquarters to the Fine Arts Building.
October 31-November 1: IESA holds their annual convention in Decatur. Elvira Downey becomes the president.

1912

 October: Trout becomes president of IESA.
October 2: The IESA state convention is held in Galesburg, Illinois.
 December 12: Suffrage mass meeting takes place at the same time as the National American Woman Suffrage Association (NAWSA) convention in Chicago.

1913

 January: Alpha Suffrage Club is formed.
March: Ida B. Wells, Grace Wilbur Trout and other Illinois suffragists march in the Woman Suffrage Procession in Washington, D.C. Wells refuses to be segregated in this parade.
May 7: The presidential and municipal suffrage bill for women passes the State Senate.
June 11: The presidential and municipal suffrage bill passes the state House.
June 13: Suffragists hold a "Victory Banquet" at the Leland Hotel in Springfield.
June 26: Women's suffrage bill for Presidential and local elections signed by governor into law.
July 1: Jubilee car parade takes place on Michigan Boulevard.

1914

 May 2: Suffrage parade takes place in Chicago with 15,000 marchers along Michigan Ave.
June: The General Federation of Women's Clubs (GFWC) holds their biennial convention in Chicago where they formally support women's suffrage.
June 13: The Illinois Supreme Court upholds women's right to vote in School officer elections in Plummer v. Yost.
August 15: Self-Denial Day to raise money for suffrage efforts.
1915

 IESA holds their annual convention in Peoria, Illinois.

1916

 June: During the Republican National Convention, 5,000 women marched for women's suffrage.
June: The National Woman's Party (NWP) is formed in Chicago.
1917

 The IESA convention is held in Danville, Illinois.

1919

 June 10: Illinois is the first state to vote to ratify the Nineteenth Amendment.
June 24: Suffragists hold a celebration of the ratification at the La Salle Hotel.

1920s 
1920

 January: The Illinois Constitutional Convention discusses adding women's suffrage to the state constitution.
February 14: The League of Women Voters (LWV) is formed at the Pick Congress Hotel in Chicago.

See also 

 List of Illinois suffragists
 Women's suffrage in Illinois
 Women's suffrage in states of the United States
 Women's suffrage in the United States

References

Sources 

 

Illinois suffrage
Politics of Illinois
Timelines of states of the United States
Suffrage referendums